McElveen is a surname. Notable people with the surname include:

Bubba McElveen (1928–2006), American politician
Jermaine McElveen (born 1984), Canadian football player
Joe McElveen (born 1946), American politician
Pryor McElveen (1881–1951), American baseball player
Thomas McElveen, American politician